Etienne Gabriel Cassan (7 January 1884 – 3 March 1942) was a French racing cyclist. He rode in the 1909 Paris–Roubaix. He and his wife died in a British air raid in 1942 during World War II.

References

1884 births
1942 deaths
French male cyclists
Sportspeople from Aveyron
French civilians killed in World War II
Deaths by airstrike during World War II
Cyclists from Occitania (administrative region)